Edgar Ranes Erice (born June 15, 1960) is a Filipino politician. He is a former representative of the second district of Caloocan as a member of the Philippine House of Representatives. He is more fondly known as Egay. Currently, he serves the Aksyon Demokratiko Party as the Regional Chairman for NCR.

He served as the representative of the 2nd district of Caloocan where he won a second term in the May 9, 2016 election, as confirmed and proclaimed with 100,095 votes, defeating Mary Mitzy “Mitch” Cajayon-Uy with 51,792 votes. And he won for his third and last term as Representative in the 2019 election, as confirmed and proclaimed with 124,223 landslide votes against Noel Cabuhat with 13,349 votes.

Early life and education 
Egay first came to public service when he was 15 years old and became part of Kabataang Barangay Chairman or currently known as Sangguniang Kabataan. He was the President of the Kabataang Barangay for Caloocan (1975-1981).

Further, Egay is a leader of the Liberal Party of the Philippines for 18 years (since 1988) and he is the current Regional Chairman for National Capital Region of Aksyon Demokratiko and the Past President of the Rotary Club of Caloocan District 3800 and a past navigator of Andres Bonifacio Assembly – Knights of Columbus.

Egay is an Alumnus of Caloocan High School (1973-1977) and earned his Bachelor of Arts in Political Science at University of Sto.Tomas as a beneficiary of “Study-now, Pay-Later Plan” of Caloocan.

Political career

Caloocan President of Kabataang Barangay (1975) 
He started his political career when he was 15 years old as Kabataang Barangay Chairman and became the President of the Kabataang Barangay of Caloocan.

Caloocan city council member (1995–2001) 
A member of Caloocan city council serving two consecutive terms or six consecutive years at the age of 35.

Congressional stint (2001–2004; 2013–2022) 
After his stint at the city council, he became the representative of Caloocan's 2nd congressional district.
He was elected in 2013 under the Liberal Party and re-elected in 2016 and in 2019.

Vice Mayor of Caloocan under Mayor Echiverri (2010–2013) 
He ran for vice-mayor in the 2010 elections under the Liberal Party-coalition of Mayor Enrico Echiverri. He was elected defeating Rey Malonzo who was the running mate of Luis Asistio. He was also the President of the Vice Mayors' League of the Philippines that time and Director of Metro Manila Development Council

Mayoral attempt (2004 and 2022) 
He ran for mayor of Caloocan under the Liberal party but lost to Enrico Echiverri.
He ran again in 2022 but lost to Dale "Along" Malapitan.

Other political experience 
(1980 – 1982) Administrative Officer I – Metro Manila Commission (MMDA)

(1982 – 1984) Plans & Programs Officer – Metro Manila Commission (MMDA)

(1984 – 1986) Chief, Research and statistics Office – Metro Manila Commission (MMDA)

(1986 – 1987) Area Manager – Environmental Sanitation Center Caloocan

(1989 – 1992) Chief of staff – Office of Congressman Virgilio P. Robles

References

External links
 Egay Erice, Official Facebook Page

1960 births
Filipino politicians
Liberal Party (Philippines) politicians
Lakas–CMD (1991) politicians
Aksyon Demokratiko politicians
Living people